Wheel chocks (or chocks) are wedges of sturdy material placed closely against a vehicle's wheels to prevent accidental movement.  Chocks are placed for safety in addition to setting the brakes.  The bottom surface is sometimes coated in rubber to enhance grip with the ground.  For ease of removal, a rope may be tied to the chock or a set of two chocks.  One edge of the wedge has a concave profile to contour to the wheel and increase the force necessary to overrun the chock. Most commonly, chocks are seen on aircraft and train cars.

Automobiles usually have parking brakes on the rear wheels.  If the rear axle is jacked off the ground with only the parking brake set, the vehicle may roll on the front wheels and fall.  Chocking the front wheels prevents this mishap.
Motorcycle and bicycle chocks are bifurcated and fit around the wheel, supporting the bike and preventing its movement.

The mining industry uses wheel chocks to protect lubrication trucks and heavy maintenance vehicles from slipping on off-road terrain when placed in Park. These circumstances will benefit from urethane wheel chocks that are lightweight enough to be maneuvered, yet can withstand the responsibility of holding a truck if a brake should fail. The Mine Safety and Health Administration (MSHA) has established standards that wheel chocks are used when a vehicle is parked on a grade, and Occupational Safety and Health Administration (OSHA) has guidelines that require wheel chocks during loading or unloading of a heavy truck.

Parking chocks
A parking space commonly contains a parking chock (also known as a parking curb, parking bumper, wheel stop, parking chock, curb stop, bumper block, and turtarrier), a barrier which is used to prevent cars from pulling too far into the space and obstructing an adjacent parking space, curb, or sidewalk.

This barrier is usually made of concrete or recycled plastic and will normally be a horizontal bar to prevent the tires from moving forward or a vertical bar that may cause damage to the vehicle if contact is made. In a parking garage, the barrier will often be a concrete wall. The recycled plastic parking stops are lighter weight than concrete and will not crack or chip. This lighter version can be installed by one person and will resist auto oils and fuels and will never need maintenance such as repainting.

Gallery

See also 
 Chocks
 Railway wheel stop

References

External links
 

Aviation ground support equipment
Tools